Donnie Defreitas (born June 10, 1985) is a former swimmer from Saint Vincent and the Grenadines, who specialized in sprint freestyle events. Defreitas qualified for the men's 50 m freestyle at the 2004 Summer Olympics in Athens, without having an entry time. He challenged five other swimmers in heat one, including 16-year-old Emile Rony Bakale of Congo. He posted a lifetime best of 27.72 to earn a fourth spot by a 2.65-second margin behind winner Bakale. Defreitas failed to advance into the semifinals, as he placed seventy-fourth overall out of 86 swimmers in the preliminaries.

References

1985 births
Living people
Saint Vincent and the Grenadines male freestyle swimmers
Olympic swimmers of Saint Vincent and the Grenadines
Swimmers at the 2004 Summer Olympics
Sportspeople from Havana